Damon, Damion, Damien or Damian Williams may refer to:

Damian "Football" Williams (born 1973), participant in 1992 Los Angeles Riots 
Damon Williams (born 1973), American basketball power forward
Damian Williams (lawyer) (born 1981/1982), American lawyer
Damion Williams (born 1981), Jamaican soccer player
Damian Williams (wide receiver) (born 1988), American football wide receiver
Damien Williams (born 1992), American football running back

See also
 Damon Williams (born 1973), American basketball player